Steven Christoffer Nielsen (born June 6, 1996) is a Danish professional gridiron football offensive lineman for the Raiders Tirol of the European League of Football (ELF).

College career
Nielsen played college football for the Eastern Michigan Eagles from 2016 to 2019. He played in 49 games over his four-year tenure with the team.

Professional career

Jacksonville Jaguars
Nielsen signed as an undrafted free agent with the Jacksonville Jaguars on April 26, 2020. However, he was released on August 8, 2020.

Edmonton Elks
After becoming eligible for the 2021 CFL Global Draft, Nielsen was drafted second overall by the Edmonton Football Team and signed with the team on April 29, 2021. He made the active roster for the newly named Elks, following their training camp, and played in his first professional game on August 7, 2021, against the Ottawa Redblacks. He later earned his first career start on November 5, 2021, against the Saskatchewan Roughriders. He played in 13 out of 14 regular season games in 2021.

Raiders Tirol
On 17 November 2022, Raiders Tirol of the European League of Football announced they have signed Nielsen for the 2023 season.

Personal life
Nielsen was born to parents Flemming and Tina Nielsen and has two brothers, Kevin and Teddy.

References

External links
Edmonton Elks bio

1996 births
Living people
American football offensive linemen
Canadian football offensive linemen
Danish players of American football
Danish players of Canadian football
Eastern Michigan Eagles football players
Edmonton Elks players
Jacksonville Jaguars players
La Lumiere School alumni
People from Dragør Municipality
Danish expatriate sportspeople in Austria
European League of Football players